Renmin Road Subdistrict  is a subdistrict situated in Zhongshan District, Dalian, Liaoning, China. , it administers the following 12 residential communities:

Communities:
Fushou Community
Xinghe Community
Qiyi Community
Xiuzhu Community
Haigang Community
Minzhu Community
Gangxing Community
Gangsheng Community
Zhucui Community
Dongri Community
Zhujin Community
Gangyun Community

See also
List of township-level divisions of Liaoning

References

Township-level divisions of Liaoning
Dalian
Subdistricts of the People's Republic of China